Athletics Fiji is the governing body for the sport of athletics in Fiji.  The current president is Filimoni Vuli Waqa, holding the position since 2019.

History 
Athletics Fiji was founded in 1947 as Fiji Amateur Athletics Association, and was affiliated to the IAAF in the year 1950.

World Athletics 
Oceania Athletics Association (OAA)
Moreover, it is part of the following national organisations:
Fiji Association of Sports and National Olympic Committee (FASANOC)

National records 
Athletics Fiji maintains the Fijian records in athletics.

References

Fiji
Sport in Fiji
Athletics in Fiji
National governing bodies for athletics
Sports organizations established in 1947